Lathrecista asiatica festa known as the Australasian slimwing is a sub-species of Lathrecista asiatica, a dragonfly in the Libellulidae family, found only in Australia.
Its range is coastal and adjacent inland in an arc from the Northern Territory to the southern Queensland border. It is a medium-sized dragonfly with a wingspan of 60-85mm, and is usually near rivers, streams, swamps and lagoons but at times can be far from water. The male has a black and yellow thorax with brown upper parts, and a reddish-orange abdomen with a black tip. The taxon has not yet been assessed for the IUCN Red List.

Gallery

See also
 Lathrecista asiatica
 List of Odonata species of Australia

References

External links

 Catalog of Life Australasian Slimwing

Libellulidae
Odonata of Oceania
Odonata of Australia
Insects of New Guinea
Taxa named by Edmond de Sélys Longchamps
Insects described in 1897